Dirty Rotten Scoundrels may refer to:

 Dirty Rotten Scoundrels (film), a 1988 film starring Steve Martin and Michael Caine
 Dirty Rotten Scoundrels (musical), a Broadway musical based on the 1988 film
 DRS (band), a 1990s contemporary R&B group
 Jeru the Damaja (born 1972), American hip hop musician who was formerly known as D. Original Dirty Rotten Scoundrel